Palaemnema paulicoba is a species of damselfly in the family Platystictidae. It is endemic to Mexico.  Its natural habitats are subtropical or tropical moist lowland forests and rivers. It is threatened by habitat loss.

References

Endemic insects of Mexico
Platystictidae
Insects described in 1931
Taxonomy articles created by Polbot